Shamsi Fazlollahi (also Romanized as "Shamsi Fazlollāhi"; born December 1, 1941 in Tehran, Iran) is an Iranian actress. 

Shamsi Fazlollahi began her acting career in the 1950s performing for radio theater shows in the NIRTV.

Career
The 1960s saw her acting for multiple theater groups, collaborating with prominent Iranian writers and directors of the era. At the same time she also took roles in movies and TV shows. 
Dubbing for TV and cinema was also very important in her career. She is best known as the voice of Caroline in the series Little House on the Prairie, as Bambi's mother in the cartoon film and later as the narrator of Bamzi cartoon series.
She received a lifetime achievement award at the 2009 Tehran Women's Theater Festival.
She is continuing her work as an actress, both on screen and theater, while performing in radio plays for the Iranian Radio

Filmography

 Ferris wheel (2016)
 A Cube of Sugar (2011)
 Taghato (2006) Crossroads .... Naseri's Mother
 Ghazal (2001)
 Dokhtari be name Tondar (2000) A Girl Named Tondar
 Chehre (1995)
 Oboor az tale (1993)
 Bandare mehalood (1992)
 Shir Sangi (1987) Stone Lion
 Gorge bizar (1973) .... Maryam
 Takhtekhabe se nafare (1972) The Triple Bed
 Kelid (1962) The Key .... Minoo

References

External links
 
 Shamsi Fazlollahi on Whatsupiran

Living people
1941 births
People from Tehran
Actresses from Tehran
Iranian film actresses
Iranian stage actresses
Iranian television actresses
20th-century Iranian actresses